The Adelaide Convention Centre is a large convention centre on North Terrace, Adelaide, South Australia. It was the first purpose-built convention centre to be built in Australia.

History 

The convention centre was designed by John Andrews and constructed over part of the Adelaide railway station, together with the Hyatt Regency Hotel (now the InterContinental Hotel), Exhibition Hall and an office block in the 1980s as part of the Adelaide Station and Environs Redevelopment (ASER) project. It has been rebuilt and extended upon a few times since its original construction in 1987. In 1999 an extension was planned  and in late 2001 it was unveiled.  It was designed by Larry Oltmanns who was a design partner with SOM at the time.  The project won the Royal Australian Institute of Architects 2002 Awards of Merit: BHP Colourbond Steel Award, Interior Architecture and New Building.

SOM's expansion and renovation of Adelaide's Convention Centre reconnected historic parts of the city to the waterfront. Built on space assembled from air rights over a rail yard, the new facility shares a site with the Old and New South Australia State Parliament Houses, the Adelaide Exhibition Hall, the Festival Centre, and the Adelaide railway station - Casino. The SOM project, was completed with Adelaide architects Woods Bagot.,and conformed to the Adelaide Riverbank Master Plan. Its "rational cooking system", the largest of any convention centre in the world, is equipped to serve 4,000 dinners in 20 minutes. The centre's main Plenary Hall can house up to 3,500 people in full convention mode.

Looking over Torrens Lake, the centre is home to most of Adelaide's major conventions. It has also been the location of some significant commemorations of Australian icons. AVCon, an annual anime and video games convention was held at the Adelaide Convention Centre from 2009 until 2019, before it indefinitely went dormant in 2020 due to the COVID-19 pandemic in South Australia

An expansion was announced in 2011. Making the announcement, the Premier of South Australia at the time, Mike Rann, said that work would begin that year on the first stage of the $350 million expansion abutting the Morphett Street Bridge and be completed in 2014. Stage 1 would include a  multi-purpose concert space, meeting spaces and a 1000-seat ballroom over the railway tracks. Rann said Stage 2, scheduled to be completed by mid 2017, would feature a distinctive high-tech glass "arrow" structure capable of seating 3,500 people. Woods Bagot and Larry Oltmanns of Vx3 Architects.Strategists.Urban Designers were appointed as the design team for the $350 million expansion in February 2011.

See also

List of convention and exhibition centers

References

Further reading
 Features Adelaide Festival Centre and Adelaide Convention Centre, with information about the design and construction of both.

External links

 Adelaide Convention Centre

Buildings and structures in Adelaide
Tourist attractions in Adelaide
Convention centres in Australia
Buildings and structures completed in 1987
1987 establishments in Australia
Event venues established in 1987
Adelaide Park Lands